Quatre Chemins is a settlement in Guadeloupe in the commune of Les Abymes, on the island of Grande-Terre.  It is located to the west of Malignon, Jabrun-du-Sud, and Chazeau.

Populated places in Guadeloupe